Rhamphochromis longiceps, also known as the tigerfish, is a species of cichlid endemic to Lake Malawi and the upper Shire River. It can also be found in the aquarium trade. It occurs in all the habitats in the lake including inshore reefs, rock shelf and littoral zones as well as in the offshore pelagic zone. It breeds in both the south east and south west arms of the lake. The females mouthbrood the eggs and while they are doing so they migrate to shallow water to release their offspring among vegetated lagoons and swampy areas. The juveniles are found near the surface in inshore waters over the shelf and littoral zones. This species is the type species of the genus Rhamphochromis.

References

longiceps
Taxa named by Albert Günther
Fish described in 1864